Stark County is a county in the U.S. state of North Dakota. As of the 2020 census, the population was 33,646. Its county seat is Dickinson.

Stark County is part of the Dickinson, ND Micropolitan Statistical Area.

History
The Dakota Territory legislature created the county on February 10, 1879, taking area from now-extinct Howard and Williams counties and some previously unincorporated territory. It was named for George Stark, a vice president of the Northern Pacific Railroad. The county organization was not completed at that time, but the new county was not attached to another county for administrative and judicial purposes. The county lost a portion of its area when Hettinger County was created on March 9, 1883. On May 25, 1883, the Stark County organization was effected.

The county boundaries were altered in February and in March 1887. The county was slightly enlarged on January 18, 1908, by a small strip of land (due to a redefinition of county boundary lines), giving Stark County its present boundary lines.

Geography
The south branch of the Heart River flows through the central part of Stark County, discharging into Patterson Lake at Dickinson, then flowing east-southeasterly into adjacent Morton County. The county terrain consists of semi-arid rolling hills, mostly devoted to agriculture. The terrain slopes to the east, with its highest point near its SW corner, at 2,831' (863m) ASL.

The southwestern counties of North Dakota (Adams, Billings, Bowman, Golden Valley, Grant, Hettinger, Slope, Stark) observe Mountain Time. The counties of McKenzie, Dunn, and Sioux counties are split.

Major highways

  Interstate 94
  U.S. Highway 85
  North Dakota Highway 8
  North Dakota Highway 22

Adjacent counties

 Dunn County - north/Central Time in the north part of the county
 Mercer County - northeast/Central Time
 Morton County - east/Central Time
 Grant County - southeast/Central Time
 Hettinger County - south
 Slope County - southwest
 Billings County - west

Lakes
 Abbey Lake
 Patterson Lake

Demographics

2000 census
As of the 2000 census, there were 22,636 people, 8,932 households, and 5,877 families in the county. The population density was 17 people per square mile (7/km2). There were 9,722 housing units at an average density of 7 per square mile (3/km2). The racial makeup of the county was 97.52% White, 0.23% Black or African American, 0.94% Native American, 0.23% Asian, 0.03% Pacific Islander, 0.28% from other races, and 0.78% from two or more races. 1.04% of the population were Hispanic or Latino of any race. 57.9% were of German and 10.6% Norwegian ancestry.

There were 8,932 households, out of which 32.1% had children under the age of 18 living with them, 54.9% were married couples living together, 7.9% had a female householder with no husband present, and 34.2% were non-families. 29.1% of all households were made up of individuals, and 11.9% had someone living alone who was 65 years of age or older. The average household size was 2.44 and the average family size was 3.04.

The county population contained 25.5% under the age of 18, 11.6% from 18 to 24, 26.0% from 25 to 44, 21.4% from 45 to 64, and 15.0% who were 65 years of age or older. The median age was 37 years. For every 100 females there were 97.0 males. For every 100 females age 18 and over, there were 93.0 males.

The median income for a household in the county was $32,526, and the median income for a family was $41,527. Males had a median income of $30,474 versus $20,000 for females. The per capita income for the county was $15,929.  About 7.9% of families and 12.3% of the population were below the poverty line, including 11.6% of those under age 18 and 16.7% of those age 65 or over.

2010 census
As of the 2010 census, there were 24,199 people, 10,085 households, and 6,167 families in the county. The racial makeup of the county was 95.2% white, 1.2% Asian, 1.0% American Indian, 0.8% black or African American, 0.5% from other races, and 1.3% from two or more races. Those of Hispanic or Latino origin made up 1.9% of the population. In terms of ancestry, 59.0% were German, 14.7% were Norwegian, 7.7% were Russian, 7.7% were Irish, 7.3% were Czech, 5.4% were English, and 3.5% were American.

Of the 10,085 households, 27.3% had children under the age of 18 living with them, 49.8% were married couples living together, 7.4% had a female householder with no husband present, 38.8% were non-families, and 30.9% of all households were made up of individuals. The average household size was 2.31 and the average family size was 2.90. The median age was 38.3 years.

The median income for a household in the county was $49,536 and the median income for a family was $62,560. Males had a median income of $42,338 versus $26,451 for females. The per capita income for the county was $25,282. About 5.9% of families and 10.0% of the population were below the poverty line, including 12.9% of those under age 18 and 13.1% of those age 65 or over.

Communities

Cities

 Belfield
 Dickinson (county seat)
 Gladstone
 Richardton
 South Heart
 Taylor

Unincorporated communities

 Antelope
 Daglum
 Lefor
 Schefield
 Zenith

Unorganized Territories
There are no townships in Stark County, but the United States Census Bureau divides the county into four unorganized territories:
 Dickinson North, the northern part of the county outside Dickinson, had a population of 3,326 at the 2020 Census.
 Dickinson South, the southern part of the county, had a population of 577 at the 2020 Census.
 East Stark, the eastern part of the county outside Gladstone, Taylor, and Richardton, had a population of 849 at the 2020 Census.
 West Stark, the western part of the county outside Belfield and South Heart, had a population of 632 at the 2020 Census.

Politics
Stark County voters have tended to vote Republican for decades. In no national election since 1964 has the county selected the Democratic Party candidate (as of 2020).

See also
 National Register of Historic Places listings in Stark County, North Dakota

References

External links
 Stark County, ND official website
 Stark County maps, Sheet 1 (eastern) and Sheet 2 (western), North Dakota DOT

 
Dickinson, North Dakota micropolitan area
1883 establishments in Dakota Territory
Populated places established in 1883